, is a PlayStation game published by Atlus Co. Ltd. Japan. Released in 1996 in Japan, it was never officially translated into English.

Bloody Bride in essence is a dating simulation. You play as a young vampire who has reached (vampire) adulthood. He is sent to earth to suck the blood of a girl with a 'platinum aura'. However the girl has to willingly allow him to suck her blood. The character is given three years to complete his mission.

External links
Bloody Bride Translation project home

1996 video games
PlayStation (console) games
PlayStation (console)-only games
Japan-exclusive video games
Yun Kōga
Atlus games
Video games developed in Japan